The Economic Times is an Indian English-language business-focused daily newspaper. It is owned by The Times Group. The Economic Times began publication in 1961. As of 2012, it is the world's second-most widely read English-language business newspaper, after The Wall Street Journal, with a readership of over 800,000. It is published simultaneously from 14 cities: Mumbai, Bangalore, Delhi, Chennai, Kolkata, Lucknow, Hyderabad, Jaipur, Ahmedabad, Nagpur, Chandigarh, Pune, Indore, and Bhopal. Its main content is based on the Indian economy, international finance, share prices, prices of commodities as well as other matters related to finance. This newspaper is published by Bennett, Coleman & Co. Ltd. The founding editor of the paper when it was launched in 1961 was P. S. Hariharan. The current editor of The Economic Times is Bodhisattva Ganguli.

The Economic Times is sold in all major cities in India.

Other ventures
In June 2009, The Economic Times launched a television channel called ET Now.

In 2018, the house of The Economic Times launched a member-only platform called ET Prime. It claims to be a business storytelling platform. ET Prime's current editor (2022) is Shishir Prasad.

The Economic Times also has a portfolio management tool called ET Portfolio.

The Economic Times also launched ETHRWorld and ETBrandEquity. Author-Publicist Aatish Jaisinghani has also been featured on Economic Times for his take on the shift in audience dynamics and the impact on brand remunerations with National brand campaigns.

In 2017 Economic Times launched a website ET Hindi for the business news in Hindi.

In 2022 Economic Times launched its website in the seven other Indian languages; ET Gujarati, ET Marathi, ET Bengali, ET Tamil, ET Malayalam, ET Telugu and ET Kannada.

Editors
1960s and 1970s: P. S. Hariharan (1961–1964), D. K. Rangnekar (1964–1979) 
1980s: Hannan Ezekiel, Manu Shroff (1985–1990) 
Early to mid 1990s: Jaideep Bose, T. N. Ninan, Swaminathan Anklesaria Aiyar 
2004: Rajrishi Singhal and Rahul Joshi
2010 to 2015: Rahul Joshi
2015 until date: Bodhisatva Ganguli

See also
 List of newspapers in India by circulation

References

External links

ET Play Podcast

1961 establishments in Maharashtra
Business newspapers published in India
Daily newspapers published in India
English-language newspapers published in India
National newspapers published in India
Newspapers published in Kolkata
Newspapers published in Mumbai
Newspapers published in Patna
Publications established in 1961
Publications of The Times Group